Perenniporiella is a genus of five species of polypore fungi in the family Polyporaceae. The genus was segregated from Perenniporia by Cony Decock and Leif Ryvarden in 2003 with P. neofulva as the type species.

Species
Perenniporiella chaquenia Robledo & Decock (2009) – Argentina
Perenniporiella micropora (Ryvarden) Decock & Ryvarden (2003)
Perenniporiella neofulva (Lloyd) Decock & Ryvarden (2003)
Perenniporiella pendula Decock & Ryvarden (2003)
Perenniporiella tepeitensis (Murrill) Decock & R.Valenz. (2010) – Mexico; Southeastern United States

References

Polyporales genera
Polyporaceae
Taxa named by Leif Ryvarden
Fungi described in 2003